Costigymnites is an extinct genus of cephalopods belonging to the Ammonite subclass that lived in lower Anisian (Bithynian, Ismidicus zone) in what is now Iran. The only known species is C. asiaticus, which is known from 2 incomplete specimens.

References 

Gymnitidae
Ceratitida genera
Middle Triassic ammonites
Ammonites of Asia